Dmitry Grigorievich Ponomarev (3 November 1908 – 26 December 1982) was a Soviet submarine commander who was awarded the title Hero of the Soviet Union for actions in the Soviet-Japanese War.

Biography 
Born in a working class family in Arkhangelsk, Dmitry has graduated from the Arkhangelsk naval college (after named as Admiral Makarov State Maritime Academy) in 1929, and started as a sailing-master on merchant vessel. In 1930, he joined the Red Army where he served until 1931. From 1933 to 1935, he was a student of educational detachment of diving named by Sergey Kirov. In 1935 he started off as an assistant to the commander of submarine of Pacific Fleet, later becoming the submarine commander himself (33rd division and 31st division of submarines in 1939).
Since 1940, he was a commander of the Petropavlovsk naval base of Pacific Fleet. Dmitry was a participant in Soviet–Japanese War in 1945. During Invasion of the Kuril Islands, he has prepared, and in difficult weather conditions has accomplished a transition by the sea, executed landing operation to fortified islands of Shusha and Paramushir, and has organized a neutralization of enemy's strong points and weapon placements. For the successful realization of this operation,  he had been given the rank of the Hero of the Soviet Union. After that, he continued his service to the navy. In 1948, Ponomarev has ended the academic courses. Since 1954, he was living in Leningrad, and died in 1982.

Awards 
Hero of the Soviet Union
Order of Lenin
Order of the Red Banner
Order of the Patriotic War 1st class
Two Orders of Red Star

References

Bibliography 
 
 
 

1908 births
1982 deaths
Soviet military personnel of World War II
Heroes of the Soviet Union
Soviet submarine commanders